William Burch may refer to:
 William P. Burch, American Thoroughbred horse racing trainer
 William O. Burch, United States Navy admiral